Negeri FM (stylised as NEGERI fm) is a Malay language-radio station broadcasting from Seremban, Malaysia which is operated by the Radio Televisyen Malaysia. Negeri FM has been in operation since 1990. It provides the latest news, plays Western music, other entertainment, religious programmes etc. It covers the areas of Negeri Sembilan, Klang Valley (Kuala Lumpur & Selangor), Malacca, North Johor and parts of Pahang in Malaysia. Negeri FM is transmitted in Malay language. Negeri FM provides hourly news broadcasts. Negeri FM broadcasts in Negeri Sembilan on 92.6 MHz.

Frequencies 
 92.6 MHz Gunung Telapa Burok for Seremban, Port Dickson, Shah Alam and Kuala Lumpur
 107.7 MHz Gunung Ledang for Gemencheh, Gemas, Malacca and Parts of North Johor
 95.7 MHz Bukit Tampin for Tampin and Alor Gajah

Defunct 
 101.3 MHz Port Dickson (ended since November 2010 and replaced by Kool FM (now Buletin FM) in March 2016.
 107.9 MHz Seremban from RTM Seremban (ended since 2006 and replaced by Klasik Nasional (now Radio Klasik), finally ceased in November 2009)
 96.3 MHz Gemencheh (ended since 2007)

References

External links 
 

1990 establishments in Malaysia
Radio stations in Malaysia
Malay-language radio stations
Mass media in Seremban
Radio Televisyen Malaysia